Judy Griffin is an American author and politician, and a member of the New York State Assembly, representing the 21st district which includes portions of the town of Hempstead in Nassau County on Long Island. A Democrat, Griffin was first elected in 2018.

Born and raised on Long Island, Griffin holds a Bachelor of Science in Business Economics with minors in Political Science and Communication from the State University of New York at Oneonta. She later worked in the financial industry, including at Dean Witter Reynolds. An integrative health coach, Griffin founded a health coaching business and co-founded a corporate wellness business. She also authored the book Flourish Beyond 50. For many years, she advocated for the betterment of public education on Long Island. Griffin previously served as Director of Community Outreach for state Senator Todd Kaminsky.

In 2018, she decided to run for the New York State Assembly in District 21 against incumbent Republican Brian F. Curran of Lynbrook, New York who had held the seat since 2010. In the 2018 New York state elections on November 6, 2018, Griffin unseated Curran, 51% to 46%. It is the first time a Democrat has held the seat in 42 years.

Griffin and her family have resided in Rockville Centre, New York for nearly 30 years.

References

External links 

 New York Assemblywoman Judy Griffin (D-Rockville Centre)

Living people
Democratic Party members of the New York State Assembly
People from Rockville Centre, New York
State University of New York at Oneonta alumni
21st-century American politicians
21st-century American women politicians
Women state legislators in New York (state)
1963 births